Meteosat 8 is a weather satellite, also known as MSG 1. The Meteosat series are operated by EUMETSAT under the Meteosat Transition Programme (MTP) and the Meteosat Second Generation (MSG) program. Notable for imaging the first meteor to be predicted to strike the earth, 2008 TC3. Launched 28 Aug 2002 by an Ariane V155, this European Meteorology satellite is in a Geostationary orbit.

While Meteosat 8 meteorological instruments are working, solid state power amplifier SSPA-C failed in October 2002.

On 22 May 2007, the satellite experienced an unexpected orbit change. This was initially assessed as due to a hit by an unknown object, but that was later assessed not to be credible. The thermal protection was damaged at the same time as the orbit change. Subsequent investigation assessed the Meteosat-8 spinning spacecraft's orbit change due to the mass release of thermal covering whose attachment failed.  Meteosat-8 is still operating, and as of April 2013 is providing a backup capability to the Meteosat-10 primary 0-degree Full Earth Scan Service and also a backup to the Meteosat-9 Rapid Scan Service over Europe.

In May 2012 Meteosat-8 switched to operating in an Earth Sensor Mode due to a problem with the sun sensor data on board. After modifying the ground image processing system the Rapid Scan Service image quality was restored back to nominal.

On 29 June 2016, EUMETSAT approved the proposal of relocating Meteosat-8 to 41.5°E, for the continuation of the Indian Ocean Data Coverage (IODC), replacing Meteosat-7. Meteosat-8 arrived at 41.5°E on 21 September. The distribution of IODC Meteosat-8 data, in parallel to Meteosat-7 data, started on 20 October. On 1 February 2017, Meteosat-8 replaced Meteosat-7 as the official EUMETSAT geostationary satellite for the Indian Ocean.

Meteosat-8 is expected to run out of fuel sometime in 2020 and its availability lifetime will end in 2022.

References 

Weather satellites